Heinrichsthal is a community in the Aschaffenburg district in the Regierungsbezirk of Lower Franconia (Unterfranken) in Bavaria, Germany. It is part of the Verwaltungsgemeinschaft (Administrative Community) of Heigenbrücken.

Geography

Location

Heinrichsthal lies in the Bavarian Lower Main (Bayerischer Untermain) in the Mittelgebirge (hill range) Spessart. It is a part of the district of Aschaffenburg.

Constituent communities
Heinrichsthal has the following Gemarkungen (traditional rural cadastral areas): Altenplos, Cottenbach, Heinersreuth, Unterwaiz. The two hamlets of Unterlohrgrund and Oberlohrgrund on district road AB 7 are parts of the community.

History
As part of the Archbishopric of Mainz, Heinrichsthal passed at Secularization in 1803 to the newly formed Principality of Aschaffenburg, with which it passed in 1814 (by this time it had become a department of the Grand Duchy of Frankfurt) to Bavaria. In the course of administrative reform in Bavaria, the current community came into being with the Gemeindeedikt (“Municipal Edict”) of 1818.

Population development
Within the municipal area lived 848 inhabitants in 1970, 892 in 1987 and 934 in 2000.

Politics

Town council

The council is made up of 9 council members, counting the part-time mayor.

(as at municipal election held on 3 March 2008)

Mayor
The Mayor is Udo Kunkel, elected in 2020.

Economy and infrastructure
Municipal tax revenue in 1999 amounted to €384,000 (converted), of which business tax revenue accounted for €3,000.

According to official statistics, there were 87 workers on the social welfare contribution rolls working in producing businesses in 1998. In trade and transport this was 0. In other areas, 29 workers on the social welfare contribution rolls are employed, and 328 people are remote workers. There is one processing business. No businesses are in construction, and furthermore, in 1999, there were 11 agricultural operations with a working area of 170 ha, of which 85 ha was cropland and 84 ha was meadowland.

Education
The following institutions are to be found in Heinrichsthal (as of 1999):
Kindergarten: 50 kindergarten places with 44 children

References

Aschaffenburg (district)